The Wagner–Ritter House & Garden, located in Johnstown, Pennsylvania, is a modest house that was occupied for 130 years by three generations of a steel worker's family, from the 1860s to the 1990s. The house and garden have been restored by the Johnstown Area Heritage Association.  The historic house museum illustrates the domestic lives of this immigrant family, interpreting the home lives of the thousands who toiled in the shadow of the mill. The Wagner-Ritter House is located on Broad Street in the Cambria City neighborhood.

The rooms of the house display appliances and furnishings of the 1800s as well as a 19th-century German raised bed garden. The yard contains a barn, privy, and a bake oven shelter that have been recreated based on historical and archeological evidence.

The four room home was built by George and Franziska Wagner and it grew to include seven rooms after the birth of their thirteen children. This house is one of about a dozen remaining structures in this working-class neighborhood that survived the Johnstown Flood. History tells a story of the significance of the house during the flood. As the family was huddled on the second floor, they were able to drag a woman out the floodwater to safety through a window.

The Johnstown Area Heritage Association also operates the Johnstown Flood Museum and the Heritage Discovery Center, which includes the Johnstown Children's Museum.

References

External links
 Wagner-Ritter House & Garden - Johnstown Area Heritage Association

1860s architecture in the United States
Buildings and structures in Johnstown, Pennsylvania
Museums in Cambria County, Pennsylvania
Historic house museums in Pennsylvania
Tourist attractions in Johnstown, Pennsylvania
Houses in Cambria County, Pennsylvania
Historic House Museums of the Pennsylvania Germans